Nicanor Espina Yñiguez (November 6, 1915 – April 13, 2007) was a Filipino politician and Speaker of the Regular Batasang Pambansa from 1984 to 1986. Considered the "Father of Southern Leyte", he authored the law that created the province of Southern Leyte.

Early life and education 
Yñiguez finished his Associate in Arts degree from Silliman University in 1935. Later, he graduated from the University of the Philippines, where he joined the Upsilon Sigma Phi fraternity with Ferdinand Marcos in 1937.

Political career 
Yñiguez was first elected to the House of Representatives on December 30, 1957, as representative of Leyte's third district. During his first term, he filed a bill creating the Province of Southern Leyte. This bill became Republic Act No. 2227 and was signed into law by President Carlos P. Garcia in 1959. In 1961, he became the first representative of Southern Leyte's at-large district.

He became an Assemblyman from 1984 to 1986, where he served as Speaker of the Batasang Pambansa. In 1986, he was Acting President of Kilusang Bagong Lipunan.

After the 1986 People Power Revolution, Yñiguez fled from the Philippines.

Death 
He died on April 13, 2007. He was married for 66 years to Salvacion Oppus Yñiguez, who died in September 2005. Their eldest child, Gabriel, died young. They are survived by their children Rosette and Alfredo, and several grandchildren and great-grandchildren.

References 

1915 births
2007 deaths
University of the Philippines alumni
Speakers of the House of Representatives of the Philippines
Members of the House of Representatives of the Philippines from Leyte (province)
Members of the House of Representatives of the Philippines from Southern Leyte
People from Southern Leyte
Members of the Batasang Pambansa